Riocontra is a type of argot in the Italian language, featuring inversion of syllables in a word or metathesis, and is common in slang and youth language.

Background
The language developed in the 1970s in the neighborhood of Lambrate in Milan, It was made famous by Guido Nicheli and Diego Abatantuono, in the 1983 film Il ras del quartiere. We remember the intervention by some amateurs who appeared sometimes on television in the Portobello program, in which amateurs preferred to reverse the order of the individual sounds and not of the syllables (casa (house)> asac).

Formation rules of neologisms 
In spite of insufficient education and non-standard use of the language, Riocontra speakers have produced a rich lexical repertoire. The passage from the official language to Riocontra occurs as mentioned mainly through the inversion of the syllables, but also with the change of the last vowel and truncation and elision in the last vowel of the neologism formed.

Examples 
The table below summarizes and gives examples of this formation (the cell is left blank when the change does not apply to that term).

The r move 
The pronunciation of the letter "r" at the end of an inverted word risks merging with the next word or even not being pronounced, so it is placed between the two syllables once inverted to make the pronunciation more fluid.

Furto - toFu(r) - to(r)Fu............. Torfu
Carte - teCa(r) - te(r)Ca............... Terca
Morte - teMo(r) - te(r)Mo............... Termo

The exception is the word merda, which although it can become darme, becomes damer or rdame

Some syntactic gemination also happens:

 chesciato → tochescia → tocchescia
 Riccone → nericco → nerrico
tocco → ccoto → cotto

It should also be noted that, with the inversion, the plural is lost.

Babbi → (i) boba
Sbirri → (i) rosbi
Selvagge → (le) gioselva
Tipe → (le) pati
Chili → (i) lochi

Developments of the riocontra 

The riocontra then gradually spread throughout Italy with the advent of trap music, as the language of the youth groups. Taking up mechanisms similar to those of verlan, similar jargons have also been established in other Western countries. On the other hand, the trancorio developed in the Mompiano district of Brescia. The Milanese rapper Nerone is until now the only one to have experienced the possibility of writing a song almost entirely in Riocontra. The song is ironically titled La Miaccade Llade Scacru, or "La Accademia della Crusca" (Album: , 2017) or Foschi al zzoca (schifo al cazzo) (Album: , 2020). The Milanese rapper Lazza usually uses Riocontra in his productions as with the album . Quentin40 and Puritano's Thoiry piece is also of relevance for its jargon based on apocope or shortenings.

Note

Bibliography 
 Aldofre e Nigiova Di Nobru, "Il Riocontra illutostra" , Giulio è in Audi editore, 2017

See also 
 Jargon
 Verlan
 Vesre
 Furbesco
 Farfallino alphabet

Slang
Cant languages
Anthropological linguistics
Italian language
Jargon
Language games
Hip hop terminology
Italian slang